Emilija Stojmenova Duh (born 25 December 1985) is a Macedonian-Slovenian electrical engineer and politician.

She is the current minister without portfolio, responsible for the digital transformation of the Republic of Slovenia.

Youth and education
She was born in Vinica, Macedonia, and moved to Maribor in 2002, when she received a scholarship from the Ad Futura agency for schooling as part of the International Baccalaureate, which was implemented by the II. Maribor high school. She completed her studies at the Faculty of Electrical Engineering, Computer Science and Informatics. She completed her doctoral studies in 2013.

Career
After graduation, she got a job as a young researcher at Iskratel. After completing her doctoral studies, she got a job at the Faculty of Electrical Engineering in Ljubljana, where she is currently an associate professor at the Department of Information and Communication Technologies. There, she also led the digital junction 4PDIH, a partnership between the Faculty of Electrical Engineering and the Community of Municipalities of Slovenia, which raises awareness of the importance of digitization.

Between 2014 and 2016, she was the head of Demol Slovenia, part of the Demol international network. From February 2018 to October 2019, she was the executive director of the Digital Innovation Junction of Slovenia. She was a member of the board of directors of the Public Research Agency of the Republic of Slovenia, and is currently a member of the expert council of the Employment Agency of the Republic of Slovenia.

She was a finalist in the Engineer of the Year 2018 selection and nominated for Slovene Woman of the Year 2021.

Politics

Digitalization Strategy Council
On 10 April 2021 she was appointed as a member of the Prime Minister's new consultative body, namely the Strategic Council for Digitization, headed by Mark Boris Andrijanič. She later resigned from the council on 7 June 2021, citing wasted opportunities to finance development projects.

Candidacy in the 2022 National Assembly elections
Stojmenova Duh also ran in 2022 National Assembly elections, she appeared on the list of Social Democrats, namely in Maribor in the 7th electoral unit. Since she was not elected as a representative, she switched to the Freedom Movement party on 10 May 2022.

Minister for Digital Transformation
From 1 June 2022, in the 15th Slovenian government under the leadership of Robert Golob, she is the Minister for Digital Transformation.

References

1985 births
Living people
Slovenian politicians
Slovenian people of Macedonian descent
People from Maribor